The 1993 Copenhagen Open was a men's tennis tournament played on indoor carpet courts in Copenhagen, Denmark that was part of the World Series of the 1993 ATP Tour. It was the sixth edition of the tournament and was held from 1 March 1 until 7 March 1993. Unseeded Andrei Olhovskiy won the singles title.

Finals

Singles

 Andrei Olhovskiy defeated  Nicklas Kulti, 7–5, 3–6, 6–2
 It was Olhovskiy's only singles title of the year and the first of his career.

Doubles

 David Adams /  Andrei Olhovskiy defeated  Martin Damm /  Daniel Vacek, 6–3, 3–6, 6–3

References

External links
 ITF tournament edition details

Copenhagen Open
Copenhagen Open
1993 in Danish tennis